Fata Kot Taja is a village of Tehsil Bhawana which is located at the bank of the Chenab River 18 km far from Bhawana. This village has one of the oldest primary schools in that area.

Villages in Chiniot District
Chiniot District